Viola Shelly Schantz (1895–1977) was an American biologist and zoologist. She worked for the United States Fish and Wildlife Service from 1918 to 1961, as a  biological aide, biologist and systematic zoologist.  Stationed at the Smithsonian Institution throughout her career, she was the curator for the North American mammal collection in the National Museum of Natural History.

Biography
Schantz was born in 1895 in Salisbury Township, Lehigh County, Pennsylvania to parents John and Laura Schantz.

She died in May 1977 at the age of 82 in the District of Columbia.

Professional accomplishments
Schantz was one of the founding members of the American Society of Mammalogists (ASM),
and was present at their inaugural meeting at the United States National Museum (now the National Museum of Natural History), in Washington, D.C. on April 3–4, 1919. Schantz served as treasurer for the organization for twenty-two consecutive years, from 1930 to 1952, and was the first woman to  chair the Local Committee for the annual meeting of the ASM in 1959.

Publications
She co-authored, with James Arthur Poole, a comprehensive catalog of the mammal specimens in the collections of the United States National Museum, which was published in 1942.

Awards and honours
Schantz received an award for distinguished service, presented to her by the Department of the Interior, 1962.

References

External links
 

20th-century American zoologists
Smithsonian Institution people
1895 births
1977 deaths
20th-century American women scientists
American mammalogists
Scientists from Pennsylvania
American women curators
American curators